The 2016–17 Portland Pilots women's basketball team represented the University of Portland in the 2016–17 NCAA Division I women's basketball season. The Pilots, led by third year coach Cheryl Sorensen. They played their homes games at Chiles Center and were members of the West Coast Conference. They finished the season 6–24, 4–14 in WCC play to finish in last place. They lost in the first round of the WCC women's tournament to Pacific.

Roster

Schedule and results

|-
!colspan=9 style="background:#461D7C; color:#FFFFFF;"| Exhibition

|-
!colspan=9 style="background:#461D7C; color:#FFFFFF;"| Non-conference regular season

|-
!colspan=9 style="background:#461D7C; color:#FFFFFF;"| WCC regular season

|-
!colspan=9 style="background:#461D7C; color:#FFFFFF"| WCC Women's Tournament

See also
 2016–17 Portland Pilots men's basketball team

References

Portland
Portland Pilots women's basketball seasons